Renat Olehovych Mochulyak (born 15 February 1998) is a Ukrainian professional football midfielder who last played for Livyi Bereh Kyiv.

Career
Mochulyak began his playing career with FC Chornomorets and FC Dynamo Kyiv youth teams. Then at 18 he was promoted to FC Dynamo-2 Kyiv in the Ukrainian First League. He made his first team debut entering as a second-half substitute against FC Avanhard Kramatorsk on 2 April 2016.In December 2016 he signed a contract with Greek club Platanias.

Desna-2 Chernihiv
In 2018 he moved to Desna 2 Chernihiv, the reserve squad of the main club in Chernihiv. On 29 May 2015 he made his debut with the senior team Desna Chernihiv against Chornomorets Odesa in Ukrainian Premier League in the season 2018-19. He played with Desna 2 Chernihiv, 24 matches and scored 4 goals. On 10 May 2019 he missed a penalty against Lviv.

Sfântul Gheorghe Suruceni (Loan)
In the winter transfer 2020, he went on loan to Sfântul Gheorghe Suruceni, where he got into the final of the Moldovan Cup in 2019–20.

Desna Chernihiv
In January 2021, after the good experience in Moldova, he returned to Desna Chernihiv in Ukrainian Premier League. On 31 January 2021, he played in the friendly match against PFC Lokomotiv Tashkent in Turkey. He played most of the matches in Desna-2 Chernihiv.

Desna-3 Chernihiv
On 21 August 2021 he received a yellow card against Dynamo Kyiv in the Ukrainian Premier League Reserves. On 28 August 2021 he scored for Desna-3 Chernihiv against Veres Rivne at the Chernihiv Arena in the 31st minute.

Livyi Bereh Kyiv
In October 2021 he moved to Livyi Bereh Kyiv in the Ukrainian Second League. On 2 October 2021 he made his debut against Karpaty Halych in the Ukrainian Second League and 4 days later he played against Chernihiv.

Ahrobiznes Volochysk
In February 2022 he moved to Ahrobiznes Volochysk in Ukrainian First League.

International career
In 2014 Mochulyak was called up to the Ukraine national under-16 football team where he played 6 matches and scored 1 goal. He was also called up to the Ukraine national under-17 football team where he played 7 matches and scored 3 goals.

Personal life
His father Oleh Mochulyak was also a professional football player, who played for Chornomorets Odesa, Chornomorets-2 Odesa, SC Odesa, Ivan Odesa, Tavriya Simferopol, Nyva Ternopil e Atyrau.

Career statistics

Club

Honours
Sfîntul Gheorghe
 Moldovan Cup runner-up: 2019–20

References

External links
 
 
 
 Renat Mochulyak at One Football Agency
 

1998 births
Living people
Footballers from Odesa
Ukrainian footballers
Super League Greece players
FC Dynamo-2 Kyiv players
Platanias F.C. players
Ukrainian expatriate footballers
Expatriate footballers in Greece
Ukrainian expatriate sportspeople in Greece
Association football midfielders
FC Chornomorets Odesa players
FC Desna Chernihiv players
FC Desna-2 Chernihiv players
FC Desna-3 Chernihiv players
Expatriate footballers in Moldova
Ukrainian expatriate sportspeople in Moldova
FC Sfîntul Gheorghe players
FC Livyi Bereh Kyiv players
FC Ahrobiznes Volochysk players
Ukrainian Premier League players
Ukrainian First League players
Ukrainian Second League players
Ukraine youth international footballers